Elections to the Labour Party's Shadow Cabinet took place in October 1995, at the beginning of the 1995/6 session of parliament. Under the rules then in effect, the Commons members of the Parliamentary Labour Party elected 19 members of the Official Opposition Shadow Cabinet, who were then assigned portfolios by the leader. The Labour peers elected the Leader of the Opposition in the House of Lords. In addition, the Leader of the Labour Party and Deputy Leader (Tony Blair and John Prescott, respectively) were members by virtue of those offices. With this election, for the first time, the role Opposition Chief Whip was simply another portfolio to be handed out rather than an office separately elected by the PLP. The 19 elected members of the Shadow Cabinet were the ones with the largest number of votes. MPs were required to vote for at least four women, but women were not necessarily guaranteed places in the Shadow Cabinet.

† Multiple candidates tied for position.

References

1995
Tony Blair
1995 elections in the United Kingdom
October 1995 events in the United Kingdom